John Baker (by 1501-1538 or later), of Bedford, was an English politician.

He was Mayor of Bedford for 1528-29 and 1537–38 and elected a Member (MP) of the Parliament of England for Bedford in 1529.

References

16th-century deaths
Members of the Parliament of England for Bedford
English MPs 1529–1536
Year of birth uncertain
Mayors of places in Bedfordshire